Sazhen-S is a Soviet laser/optical space surveillance system, used to analyse the orbital parameters of space craft. There are several installations across the former Soviet Union. One of which is based at space ground station NIP-19 near Dunaivtsi in Ukraine. A similar system is Sazhen-T.

History
A number of Sazhen-S installations were constructed at the network of scientific monitoring stations. At least two are now in Ukraine - one in Dunaivtsi and another at Yevpatoria. At least one is in Russia, and in 2004 it was reported that the Russian military was debugging interactions between the Russia installation(s) and the Russian Main Space Intelligence Centre

Construction of the Sazhen-S facility in Dunaivtsi started in 1979 and it was commissioned in February 1984. In 2001 upgrade work started which has continued incrementally.

Facility
Sazhen-S has five parts. The main part is an AZT-28 (АЗТ-28) telescope with a cassegrain reflector of diameter, . Connected to this there is a laser ranging system, hinged light receivers, laser calibration equipment and a system to measure angular co-ordinates by using star catalogues.

In addition it can measure the brightness of space craft if they are at a magnitude of 12 and above.

Notes

References

Buildings and structures in Crimea
Russian Space Forces